Insiders is a six-part British television drama series, created and written by playwright Lucy Gannon, that first broadcast on BBC1 on 19 February 1997. The series stars Julia Ford, Robert Cavanah and Adrian Rawlins, and follows life inside an open prison in London. The series was directed entirely by Danny Hiller.

The series broadcast over six consecutive weeks, with the concluding episode on 26 March 1997. The series is yet to be released on DVD.

Cast
 Julia Ford as Annie Whitby 
 Robert Cavanah as Gerry Cosmo
 Adrian Rawlins as Woody Pine 
 Nick Bagnall as Pat Symcox 
 Idris Elba as Robinson Bennett 
 Ron Emslie as Phillip Kennedy 
 James Warrior	as Colin Figgs
 Graham Turner	as Binny Edwards 
 Race Davies as Emma Davies
 Kaylee Anne Price as Baby Girl

Production
The series was described by the BBC as "touching", with the premise listed as "a series that follows a number of inmates, contrasting their chequered life and predicament with those of the staff."

Episodes

References

External links
 

1997 British television series debuts
1997 British television series endings
1990s British drama television series
1990s British television miniseries
BBC television dramas
English-language television shows
Television shows set in London